"Lay It Down" is a song by American R&B recording artist Lloyd taken from his fourth studio album King of Hearts. The track, which serves as the album's lead single, was produced by Polow da Don and samples Patti LaBelle's "Love, Need and Want You", as well as "Corn" by Zhnark. The single was originally released via YoungGoldie.com on August 15, 2010, and was released via iTunes on August 31, 2010.

Music video
The music video was shot in Los Angeles, California and directed by Mickey Finnegan. It premiered on October 12, 2010, on BET's 106 & Park. The video has peaked at #4 on the show. K.D. Aubert plays the leading lady with Keri Hilson and Polow da Don making cameo appearances throughout the video. As of April 2021 the video has over 70 million views on Lloyd YouTube channel.

Remixes
In a radio interview, Lloyd revealed the song would have three official remixes.

The first official remix released for pop radio features rock drums and American rapper B.o.B, and background vocals from the group Rock City on January 21, 2011. It was sent to radio in March 2011.

The second official remix, with fellow singer R. Kelly was for urban radio. It was released as the "G-Mix" featuring R. Kelly and Jeezy on January 12, 2011.

The third official remix featured a then unrevealed artist who people "wouldn't expect to hear."  The third remix was released on December 29, 2010, entitled "Lay it Down Part II – A Tribute to the Legends." It features Patti LaBelle and pays tribute to singer Aretha Franklin and the late fellow singer Teena Marie.

All three of the remixes were included and released on a digital EP via iTunes on February 15, 2011.

R&B girl group RichGirl created a remix to the song, released on their Fall in Love with RichGirl mixtape.

R&B Artist K. Michelle also released an unofficial remix of the song.

Charts

Weekly charts

Year-end charts

References

2010 singles
2010 songs
Lloyd (singer) songs
Song recordings produced by Polow da Don
Songs written by Ester Dean
Songs written by Polow da Don
Interscope Records singles